{{Infobox person
| name               = Gulshan Devaiah
| image              = Gulshan Devaiya at a special screening of Lipstick Under My Burkha (cropped).jpg
| imagesize          = 
| caption            = Devaiah at the premiere of Lipstick Under My Burkha in 2016
| birth_name         = Kambeyanda Devaiah Gulshan
| birth_date         = 
| birth_place        = Bengaluru, Karnataka, India
| yearsactive        = 2010–present
| spouse             = 
| notable_works      = HunterrrCommando 3,ShaitanHate Story| occupation         = Actor
}}

Gulshan Devaiah is an Indian actor who primarily appears in Hindi films. He is known for his roles in Shaitan, Hate Story and Hunterrr. His performance in Shaitan was critically praised and earned him a nomination for Filmfare Award for Best Male Debut.

Early life and education
Devaiah was born on 28 May 1978 in Bengaluru, Karnataka, India, and is a NIFT graduate. He is the son of Sri Devaiah and Pushpalata who were employed by Bharat Electronics Ltd. He completed his primary education at Cluny Convent and St Joseph's Indian High School. After graduation from NIFT, he got jobs in the fashion industry where he worked for 10 years. He also taught Bangalore students, fashion, at Wigan & Leigh College. Devaiah started his Bollywood journey with minor roles in Bangalore's English theatre. After he performed in several dramas, he moved to Mumbai for bigger opportunities.

Personal life
He was married to actress Kallirroi Tziafeta, from Greece, from 2012 to 2020.
Gulshan Devaiah and Kallirroi Tziafeta, who got married in 2012, are divorced now. He confirmed the news and said that the split was amicable.
Gulshan and Kallirroi, who is originally from Greece, got married in 2012, after being in a relationship for two years.

Career

Devaiah started his career from the Anurag Kashyap's short film That Girl in Yellow Boots, alongside Kalki Koechlin and Naseeruddin Shah in 2010. The film was screened at the Toronto International Film Festival, followed by the Venice Film Festival. He played the role of Chitiappa in the film. Next in 2011, he appeared in Rohan Sippy's crime thriller Dum Maaro Dum, starring Abhishek Bachchan, Bipasha Basu and Prateik Babbar, where he played the role of Ricky. In the same year, Devaiah appeared in Bejoy Nambiar's Hindi thriller film Shaitan, starring Rajeev Khandelwal and Kalki Koechlin, where he portrayed the role of Karan Chaudhary "KC". Released in June 2011, the film was a critical and commercial success, where Devaiah's performance was acclaimed. He was nominated for the several awards including, Filmfare Awards, Screen Awards, Stardust Awards and Apsara Film & Television Producers Guild Awards in the category of Best Male Debut and Best Actor in a Supporting Role, along with other ensemble characters.

In 2012, Devaiah appeared in Vivek Agnihotri's erotic thriller Hate Story, produced by Vikram Bhatt, co-starring Paoli Dam. This was his first lead role, where he portrayed the antagonistic role of Siddharth Dhanrajgir, a cocky son of a rich business tycoon. The film went on to become a sleeper hit, and garnered the positive reviews from the critics. Taran Adarsh of Bollywood Hungama rated 3/5 to the film and labelled Devaiah's performance as "excellent". The same year, he played in Vasan Bala's crime thriller film Peddlers alongside Nimrat Kaur, where he portrayed the role of Ranjit D'souza, a 20-years old boy, who gets trapped in the drug trade. The film was premiered at the Cannes Film Festival, which was muted by the critics. In 2013, Devaiah appeared in Sanjay Leela Bhansali's romantic-tragedy drama film Ram-Leela, starring Ranveer Singh and Deepika Padukone, where he played the role of Bhavani, which was a 'blockbuster' in the year. After a year gap, In 2015, Devaiah appeared in Harshavardan Kulkarni's adult comedy film Hunterrr, co-starring Radhika Apte, where he portrayed the role of Mandar Ponkshe, a sex-addicted man and describing his lustful journey in life. The film did well at the box-office. In 2016, he was also seen playing the role of an NRI in Vivek Agnihotri's film Junooniyat. Devaiah signed 3 films in 2017, Cabaret, A Death in the Gunj and CandyFlip. He played double role of twin brothers Karate Mani and Jimmy in action comedy film Mard Ko Dard Nahi Hota for which he won Screen Award for Best Supporting Actor and was also nominated for Filmfare Award for Best Supporting Actor. He played the role of Buraq Ansari in action film Commando 3. In 2020 he appeared in Amazon Prime's drama series Afsos and Netflix original film Ghost Stories''.

Filmography

Films

A

Television

Awards and nominations

References

External links 

Male actors from Bangalore
Film directors from Bangalore
Living people
1978 births
Male actors in Hindi cinema
Male actors in Kannada cinema
Indian male film actors
Filmfare Awards South winners
National Institute of Fashion Technology alumni
21st-century Indian male actors
Kodava people
Screen Awards winners
Zee Cine Awards winners